Zhang Wenyuan may refer to:
Zhang Liao (169–222), courtesy name Wenyuan, Chinese military general
Zhang Wenyuan (Water Margin), fictional character in Water Margin